Pseudarthrobacter chlorophenolicus is a species of bacteria capable of degrading high concentrations of 4-chlorophenol, hence its name. As such, it may be useful in bioremediation.

References

Further reading

External links

DBGET
Type strain of Arthrobacter chlorophenolicus at BacDive -  the Bacterial Diversity Metadatabase

Micrococcaceae
Psychrophiles
Bacteria described in 2000